A booby prize is a joke prize usually given in recognition of a terrible performance or last-place finish. A person who finishes last, for example, may receive a booby prize such as a worthless coin. Booby prizes are sometimes jokingly coveted as an object of pride.

Booby prizes may also be given as consolation prizes to all non-placing participants of a competition.

Origin 
The word "boob" stems from the Spanish  meaning silly, which in turn came from the Latin  meaning stammering; the word booby to mean dunce appeared in 1599.

Booby prize literally means "idiot's prize". The OED dates this usage to 1893. Booby trap and "booby hatch" are related terms.

See also
Bozo bit
Golden Raspberry Awards
Ig Nobel Prize
No-Prize

References

 
Ironic and humorous awards